Scottish National Party frontbench team may refer to:

Frontbench Team of Angus Robertson
Frontbench Team of Ian Blackford
Frontbench Team of Stephen Flynn

Scottish National Party